Richard G Mitchell is an English composer of music primarily for movies and television.

Mitchell was born in Manchester, England and brought up in Preston, Lancashire.  He attended Hutton Grammar School and later St Martins School of Art in the late 1970s where he graduated with a BA (Hons) in Fine Art. Was awarded an Ivor Novello Award and is best known for scoring the movies: To Kill a King, Grand Theft Parsons, A Good Woman and the 1996 BBC period TV series The Tenant of Wildfell Hall.

Original Scores

Mitchell is an English composer best known for his writing and arranging period movie scores for choir and orchestra, though his compositions span a very wide range of styles varying from classical to more contemporary electronic genres such as drum and bass and trip hop. He also has a reputation for working in a diverse range of world music styles, such as the Tibetan score for Nick Gray's Escape from Tibet in contrast to a country and western pedal steel guitar-based score for Grand Theft Parsons, successful with film music critics at the 2004 Sundance Festival

His original score for To Kill a King in 2004 continued his successful relationship with director Mike Barker, for whom he scored A Good Woman (film) in 2005, and later the Sea Wolf (miniseries)' in 2008, followed by Moby Dick (2011 miniseries)'.

His score for the film Trial by Fire won an Ivor Novello Award in 2000 and the BBC period drama The Tenant of Wildfell Hall (1996 miniseries) won Best Score at the Royal Television Society Awards in 1998.

In 2005, Mitchell composed the music for The Call of the Toad (film), written by Günter Grass and directed by Robert Gliński. The score was recorded with the Polish Symphony Orchestra, and nominated for a Polish Academy Award.

Other commissions

Aside from composing original scores for Film, Mitchell has scored music for Theatre Productions and Live Events which include the Opening Ceremony for Euro '96 at Wembley Stadium.  He was commissioned to write the score for one-man theatre show Ousama with Nadim Sawalha directed by Corin Redgrave at the Brixton Shaw Theatre, and a jazz suite for the Francis Bacon Retrospective Exhibition at the Tate Britain in 2008.

Credits

Filmography

2020
 Caveat
2011
 Moby Dick
2006
 Almost Heaven
2005
 The Call of the Toad
 A Good Woman
2004
 Tempesta
2003
 Grand Theft Parsons
2002
 To Kill a King
2000
 Children of the Holocaust
1998
 La Coupe de la Gloire (Official World Cup Movie)
1997
 Basil 
1992
 The Bridge
1986
 Born American
1983
 Rush Hour
1980
 Beastly Treatment

Original Soundtrack Albums
2012
 Moby Dick
2009
 Sea Wolf
2006
 A Good Woman
2003
 To Kill a King
 Grand Theft Parsons
2001
 The Glass
1998
 Invasion: Earth
1996
 The Tenant of Wildfell Hall
1992
 The Bridge

Television Work

2009
 Sea Wolf
2006
 Perfect Day: The Millennium
2005
 How to Have a Good Death
 Class of '76
 The Stepfather
2002
 Helen West
2001
 The Glass
 True Originals ("Latika Rana")
2000
 Brits Abroad
 Where There's Smoke
1999
 Trial by Fire
 Trauma Team
 QED
1998
 Get Real
 Invasion: Earth
1997
 Coast to Coast
 Escape From Tibet
 Bridget Jones Diary
 Beyond Belief: Fact or Fiction
1996
 The Tenant of Wildfell Hall (3 episodes)
 Euro 96 Opening Ceremony
1995
 Harry
 SuperMax (First Tuesday)
 Stolen Brides (Network First)
 Scotland Yard
1994
 Brat Pack
1990
 Cluedo
 MasterChef
1989
 War and Peace in the Nuclear Age
1988
 Across the Lake
 Seoul Olympic Theme
1987
 Worlds Beyond
 Truckers
1986
 In The Footsteps Of Scott

Awards
Won   Ivor Novello Award for "Trial By Fire" (2000)
Nominated   Polish Academy Award for "The Call of the Toad" (2005)
Nominated   Royal Television Society Award for "The Glass" (2001)
Won   Royal Television Society Award for "The Tenant of Wildfell Hall
Won   The New York Film and TV Festival best original score for "Rush Hour" (1985)

Notes

British composers
1956 births
Living people
Ivor Novello Award winners
Alumni of Saint Martin's School of Art
Musicians from Manchester
English film score composers